Events from the year 1801 in France.

Incumbents
 The French Consulate

Events
9 February – Treaty of Lunéville signed between the French First Republic and the Holy Roman Empire, ending the war with Austria.
8 March – Battle of Abukir, second battle of the Egyptian campaign. British victory.
18 March – Treaty of Florence signed between France and the Kingdom of Naples.
21 March - Treaty of Aranjuez signed between France and Spain.
21 March - Battle of Alexandria. British victory.
8 July – First Battle of Algeciras Bay. Franco-Spanish victory.
12 July – Second Battle of Algeciras Bay. British victory.
15 July – Concordat of 1801, agreement signed between France and Pope Pius VII that reaffirms the Roman Catholic Church as the majority church of France and restores some of its civil status.
17 August – Siege of Alexandria by the British begins.
2 September – Siege of Alexandria ends in British victory.
29 September – Treaty of Madrid signed between John VI of Portugal and France.
September – Metric system obligatory throughout France.
First census in France.
Joseph Marie Jacquard develops a loom where the pattern being woven is controlled by punched cards.

Births
14 January – Adolphe-Théodore Brongniart, botanist (died 1876)
1 February – Émile Littré, lexicographer and philosopher (died 1881)
6 February – Laure Cinti-Damoreau, soprano (died 1863)
22 February – Marc Girardin, politician and man of letters (died 1873)
11 March – Frédéric Berat, poet and songwriter (died 1855)
8 April – Eugène Burnouf, orientalist (died 1852)
24 April – Marthe Camille Bachasson, Count of Montalivet, statesman and Peer of France (died 1880)
30 April – André Giroux, photographer and painter (died 1879)
11 May – Henri Labrouste, architect (died 1875)
15 May – Joseph Jean Baptiste Xavier Fournet, geologist and metallurgist (died 1869)
30 June – Frédéric Bastiat, writer and political economist (died 1850)
23 July – Charles Rohault de Fleury, architect (died 1875)
28 August – Antoine Augustin Cournot, economist, philosopher and mathematician (died 1877)
6 October – Hippolyte Carnot, statesman (died 1888)
27 December – Étienne Joseph Louis Garnier-Pagès, politician (died 1841)

Full date unknown
Jean-Baptiste Honoré Raymond Capefigue, historian and biographer (died 1872)
Carron du Villards, ophthalmologist (died 1860)
Éléonore-Louis Godefroi Cavaignac, politician (died 1845)
Amédée Fauré, painter (died 1878)

Deaths
11 January – Charles Eugène Gabriel de La Croix, marquis de Castries, Marshal of France (born 1727)
9 February – Armand-Joseph Guffroy, politician (born 1742)
12 February – Jean Darcet, chemist and porcelain maker (born 1724)
2 March – Charles-Albert Demoustier, writer (born 1760)
7 April – Noël François de Wailly, grammarian and lexicographer (born 1724)
11 April – Antoine de Rivarol, writer and epigrammatist (born 1753)
8 June – Pierre Antoine Monneron, merchant, banker, writer and politician (born 1747)
6 July – Pierre Augustin Moncousu, naval officer (born 1756; killed in action at the First Battle of Algeciras)
7 September – Antoine de Sartine, statesman (born 1729)
3 October – Philippe Henri, marquis de Ségur, Marshal of France (born 1724)
29 November – François Macquard, Napoleonic general (born 1738)
Honoré Blanc, gunsmith (born 1736)
David Charpentier de Cossigny, Governor General of Pondicherry, Réunion and Mauritius (born 1740)

See also

References

1800s in France